Independent Bank is a bank headquartered in Grand Rapids, Michigan. The bank has 62 branches, all of which are in Michigan.

History
The bank traces its roots to First National Bank of Ionia, which was founded in 1864.

In 1896, relinquished its national charter and obtained a state charter, reorganized as State Savings Bank of Ionia.

in 1952, changed name to First Security Band.

In 1974, Independent Bank Corporation was established as the bank holding company. 

In 2003, the company acquired Mepco Insurance Premium Finance. Mepco was sold in 2017.

In March 2007, the bank acquired 10 branches from TCF Financial Corporation.

In December 2008, the bank received a $72 million investment from the United States Department of the Treasury as part of the Troubled Asset Relief Program. The investment was returned in 2013.

In December 2012, the bank sold 21 branches to Chemical (now TCF Financial Corporation).

In 2015, the bank closed 6 branches.

In 2018, the bank acquired Traverse City State Bank.

References

External links

Banks based in Michigan
Banks established in 1864
1864 establishments in Michigan
Companies listed on the Nasdaq